Tonga competed at the 2015 Pacific Games in Port Moresby, Papua New Guinea from 4 to 18 July 2015. Tonga listed 236 competitors as of 4 July 2015. One competitor was qualified for two sports.

Athletics

Tonga qualified 18 athletes in track and field:

Men
 Aisea Fili Vakameilalo
 Alifeleti Tuiono
 Heamatangi Tuivai
 La Shondra David Mosaati
 Larry Steven Sulunga
 Manase Talivakaola Folau
 Siueni Filimone
 Soape Polutele
 Sunia Ketuu Moala
 Tevita Tameilau
 Tongia Vakaafi
 Toutouofa Vea

Women
 Anita Paea I Okalani Fasi
 Ata Maama Tuutafaiva
 Lalana Maniana Tupou Vavau Hifo
 Malia Maketalena Fapiena Tongia
 Olivia Eteaki
 Taina Halasima

Beach volleyball

Tonga qualified 2 athletes in beach volleyball:

Men
 Metuisela Vainikolo
 Salesi Mafi Tuakoi

Bodybuilding

Tonga qualified 8 athletes in bodybuilding:

Men
 Manase Manuokafoa Afuhaamango
 Sione Natisolo Siale
 Sitani Selao Tautalanoa
 Standford Faaui
 Taniela Mosimosi Lutui
 Trevor Jimmy Kealoha Huni

Women
 Alani Latu
 Kapiolani Mausia

Boxing

Tonga qualified 8 athletes in boxing;

Men
 Fineasi Aho Matangi Lelei Tuipulotu
 Ken Stone William Hurrell
 Ofaloto Ki Tuila Moeata
 Oscar Finau
 Sepasitiano Hurrell Lavemai
 Sione Otutoa Hurrell
 Gina Heilala Kolo
 Pueki Fifita

Cricket

Tonga qualified a men's team in cricket (16 players):

Men
 Aisake Haukinima
 Aloisio Pauu
 Efalame Laumape
 Isileli Vuni
 Lea Songoimoli Tenisi
 Maamaloa Teuaki Folau Kuluka
 Nikolasi Moala
 Ofa Jr Halaapiapi
 Paula Voni Palu
 Petelo Tauvaka
 Sakini Kofeloa
 Samiuela Uhi Pese
 Sione Fanguna Kae Manumua
 Sione Havea Pese
 Soloni Helu
 Timote Manu Latu

Field hockey

Tonga qualified men's and women's teams in hockey (20 players):

Men
 Filimone Ula Paea i Moana Iloa
 Hans Juergen Katoa
 Kepueli Moimoi Jr Feke
 Mordecai Nau
 Otinili Mau
 Sesili Tuamelie Tahilanu
 Tevita Vunga
 Tomasi Lynch
 Vainga He Ofa Vea Mahe
 Viliami Fa Vatuvei

Women
 Eseta Fifita Tapiano Vi
 Lataheanga Susitina Teu
 Lilian Christina Carolyn Kaitapu
 Mateaki Siulolovao Taufa
 Pelenaise Lilo Malungahu
 Sifa Lynette
 Tangi I Loluhama Vailea
 Valeti Misinale
 Vasi Feke
 Vea Funaki

Football

Tonga qualified a women's team in football (18 players):

Women
 Alamoni Vungamoeahi
 Anne Marie Tuaefe
 Emelita Moala
 Fololeni Naitingikeili Siale
 Haisini Teu
 Ilisapeti Mkamu
 Kulia Filo
 Manusiu Latavao
 Matelita Misinale
 Mele Milate Akolo
 Mele Soakai
 Mele Teukialupe Teukialupe Likiliki
 Ofa Laakulu
 Pauline Tonga
 Penateti Lapiuingi Feke
 Sala Veamatahau
 Tangimausia Maafu
 Tupou Hinave Topui

Golf

Tonga qualified 8 athletes in golf

Men
 Alani Piukala
 Etivise Elisapeta Latu
 Kalolo Fifita
 Sione Teuhema Mahe
 Tasisio Lolesio

Women
 Lady Joyce Robyn Kaho Tuivakano
 Losa Tangimeivaha Fapiano
 Mele Kasavu Latu

Lawn bowls

Tonga qualified 8 athletes in lawn bowls;

Men
 Fangupo Taungahihifo
 Limani Toloke
 Mohe Konokono Tausinga
 Samiuela Ula Fusimalohi
 Tevita Taufa Makasini

Women
 Helen Rima Amataiti Strickland
 Malia Kioa
 Paris Floran Ann Baker

Netball

Tonga qualified a women's team in netball (12 players):

Women
 Daphne Louana Fiefia
 Fipe Fouhiva Kauvaka
 Hena Rayna Fonohema
 Lavelua Marina Stella Taulahi
 Lose Puafisi
 Loumaile Manumua
 Luseane Kalaneti Alohalani Vea
 Mollyni Anne Vakameilalo
 Sepuita Lolohea Taai
 Taumafa Tangatailoa
 Telesia Teisina
 Unaloto Taukiuvea

Rugby league nines

Tonga qualified a men's team in rugby league (26 players):

Men
 Api Kakalaia Solomone Funaki
 Bruce Folau
 Elone Taufahema
 Halasima Toa
 Leiataua Talifolau Siupeli Kilifi
 Mavae mo Hihifo Tupou
 Ofa Tuakifalelei Teisina
 Penisimani Leki
 Peteli Pitimoni Funaki
 Pita Fakahoko He Lotu Vakautakakala
 Samuela Fiefia
 Semipilivi Naea Fahamokioa
 Semisi Otu Vea Panepasa Mahe
 Setaleki Luau
 Sione Alatini
 Sione Heimuli Pangai
 Sione Unaloto Ki Felenite Fa
 Siosaia Taufa Vaotangi Maile
 Sosefo Taula Suluka
 Sydney Joseph Mcphie Havea
 Timote Afu Paseka
 Uikilifi Mafi Fotuaika
 Unaloto ki Atenoa Feao
 Vahai Nau
 Viliami Tufulele
 Viliami Tupou

Rugby sevens

Women
6th – Women's tournament.

 Nina Alofaki
 Seini Falengameesi Haukinima
 Lesila Latai Finehika Lautaimi
 Fakaola Muimui He Lotu Malungahu
 Isapela Iusini Kamoto
 Salome Sela Vaenuku
 Sela Vaenuku
 Eseta Fifita Tapiano Vi
 Ema Luisa Potaufa
 Losaline Potaufa
 Kiana Tuituimoeao Muamoholeva
 Sharon Nanivi Ae Tau Jr Vailea
 Pesalini Lave
Men
 – Men's tournament.

 Manu Tuifua
 William Mosaati Hafu
 Fetuu Finau
 Kotoni Paea I Hangai Tokelau Lotoa
 Samisoni Asi
 Filivalea Mafoa
 Sione Tuitavake Fusimalohi
 Richard Amanaki Taliauli
 Vaea Tangitau Poteki
 Siale Tonga Talakai
 Atunaisa Fakaosi
 Meiohihifo Kuli

Swimming

Tonga qualified 3 athletes in swimming:

Men
 Amini Fonua
 Tong Li James Panuve

Women
 Charissa Sofia Panuve

Table tennis

Taekwondo
Men
Soane Tualiku
Maake Ola Moui he Ofa Mafoaaeata o Pongi
Women
Ilaisaane Moala

Tennis

Tonga qualified 6 athletes in tennis

Men
 Justin Vaituniloa Ki Moana Vea
 Liua Feke
 Matavao Faleta Fanguna
 Semisi Tavake Manumanu Funa Fanguna

Women
 Kendra LaAvasa Paea
 Sisilia Laumanu I Teu

Touch rugby

Tonga qualified men's and women's teams in Touch rugby (16 players):

Men
5th – Men's tournament.
 Folau Moe Lotu Nonu Fakatava
 Pasa Fisi
 Sosaia Uluenga Hufanga
 Makameimoana Tavake
 Feaomoeata Kalu
 Alani Taumoepeau
 Peni Silako Onesi
 Levi Valenitino Fakatava

Women
5th – Women's tournament.
 Ana Latai Schaumkel
 Malia Anitasia Kolope
 Christie Ema Taufoou
 Akanesi Hifoi Pohiva
 Malia Ineti Malanata Tongia
 Litea Mirella Tuipulotu
 Folola Hufanga
 Manatu Ofa Ki Aho Takitaki
 Mele Piei

Triathlon

Tonga qualified 1 athlete in triathlon

Men
 Heitini Lelenoa

Weightlifting

Tonga qualified 6 athletes in weightlifting

Men
 Chirk Douglas Carmine Manzo
 Penisimani Angelo Fonua Siolaa
 Sateki Palei Finau Langi
 Sioeli Fotofili Tulikaki
 Wilford Christopher Vea

Notes

References

2015 in Tongan sport
Nations at the 2015 Pacific Games
Tonga at the Pacific Games